Sean Ian Reid-Foley (born August 30, 1995) is an American professional baseball pitcher in the New York Mets organization. He was selected in the second round of the 2014 Major League Baseball draft by the Toronto Blue Jays and made his debut with them in 2018. He has also played in MLB for the New York Mets.

Early life
Reid-Foley was born in Guam while his father, Dave, was assigned there while serving in the United States Coast Guard.

Reid-Foley attended Sandalwood High School in Jacksonville, Florida. As a junior in 2013, he threw a no-hitter with 16 strikeouts in a game against Flagler Palm Coast High School.

Professional career

Minor leagues
Considered by MLB.com to be the 18th overall prospect heading into the 2014 Major League Baseball draft, he was drafted by the Blue Jays in the second round, 49th overall. Having signed a commitment to Florida State University, he was passed over in the first round due to signability concerns. On June 10, 2014, he signed with the Blue Jays for a bonus of $1.128 million, and was expected to join extended spring training in Clearwater. Reid-Foley made his professional debut for the Rookie-level Gulf Coast League Blue Jays on June 27, pitching  of an inning and yielding two earned runs. He finished the 2014 regular season with a 1–2 record in nine appearances (six starts), a 4.76 ERA, and 25 strikeouts in 22 innings. Reid-Foley was promoted to the Short Season-A Vancouver Canadians on September 3, 2014, but did not make an appearance during the Northwest League playoffs.

Reid-Foley began the 2015 season with the Class-A Lansing Lugnuts, and made his debut for the team on April 14, 2015. He started the game, pitching three shutout innings and yielding only two hits and two walks while striking out six. He set career highs in innings pitched (5) and strikeouts (10) in a start on May 30 against the Dayton Dragons. His performance earned him a spot on MLB Pipeline's Prospect Team of the Week. In late June, Reid-Foley was promoted to the Advanced-A Dunedin Blue Jays. He made his debut on July 5, pitching five shutout innings against the Lakeland Flying Tigers. Reid-Foley ended the 2015 season with a 4–10 win–loss record, 4.22 ERA, and 125 strikeouts in 96 innings pitched. He was assigned to the Lansing Lugnuts to open the 2016 minor league season. After pitching to a 2.95 ERA through 58 innings, Reid-Foley was promoted to the Dunedin Blue Jays on June 16 to start that night against the Clearwater Threshers. He struck out 12 batters, establishing a new career-high, in a 4–0 win. On July 27, Reid-Foley was ranked 93rd on MLB's Top 100 Prospects list. He finished the 2016 season with a combined 10–5 record, 2.81 ERA, and 130 strikeouts in 115 innings. Reid-Foley greatly improved his pitch control in 2016, lowering his walks per nine innings rate from 6.3 in 2015 to 3.0. Reid-Foley started the 2017 season playing with the Double-A New Hampshire Fisher Cats.

Reid-Foley was assigned to the Double-A New Hampshire Fisher Cats for the entire 2017 season. He made 27 starts and posted a 10–11 win–loss record, 5.09 ERA, and 122 strikeouts in a career-high 132 innings pitched. On January 24, 2018, the Blue Jays invited Reid-Foley to spring training. He began 2018 with New Hampshire. After posting a 5–0 record with a 2.03 ERA in eight starts for the Fisher Cats, Reid-Foley was promoted to the Triple-A Buffalo Bisons on May 24.

Toronto Blue Jays
Reid-Foley was called up on August 13, 2018, and made his major league debut the same day against the Kansas City Royals. He took the loss in the game, yielding three runs on six hits and three walks, while striking out three. He and Danny Jansen became the first batterymates to debut in the same American League game since Billy Rohr and Russ Gibson did so in April 1967. Reid-Foley earned his first major league win on September 2, when he pitched seven innings of one-run baseball and struck out ten batters as the Blue Jays beat the Miami Marlins 6–1. On September 15, Reid-Foley became the first pitcher in franchise history to record 31 strikeouts through his first five major league starts, and the second to record two double-digit-strikeout games as a rookie. Reid-Foley finished with 7 starts for the Blue Jays, recording 2 wins with 4 losses in  innings while striking out 42 but also walking 21. The following season, he was 2-4 in 9 games (6 starts) in  innings.

With the 2020 Toronto Blue Jays, Reid-Foley had five relief appearances, and compiled a 1-0 record with a 1.35 ERA and 6 strikeouts in 6.2 innings pitched.

New York Mets
On January 27, 2021, Reid-Foley was traded to the New York Mets alongside right handed pitchers Yennsy Díaz and Josh Winckowski in exchange for LHP Steven Matz. Reid-Foley made his first appearance for the Mets on April 22, 2021, in relief against the Chicago Cubs. He pitched three perfect innings and recorded four strikeouts. After the game, he was sent back down to the Mets' alternate site. He was recalled on May 11, after Jacob deGrom was placed on the injured list. After replacing starting pitcher Taijuan Walker in a game on May 17 against the Atlanta Braves, Reid-Foley struck out five batters in three perfect innings and earned his first win of the season. He also got on base for the first time in his career by drawing a walk in the fifth inning. On May 31, he was demoted to the Triple-A Syracuse Mets to create room on the active roster for Seth Lugo.

On May 1, 2022, Reid-Foley was placed on the injured list with a partially torn ulnar collateral ligament in his right elbow. On May 11, Reid-Foley underwent Tommy John surgery, ending his 2022 season. On November 18, 2022, Reid-Foley was non tendered and became a free agent. He re-signed with the Mets on a minor league contract on December 6.

Personal life
His elder brother, David, was a catcher at Mercer University and signed with the Los Angeles Dodgers as an undrafted free agent in 2013. The Dodgers organization converted him into a pitcher in 2014.

References

External links

1995 births
Living people
People from Agana Heights, Guam
Guamanian baseball players
American expatriate baseball players in Canada
Major League Baseball pitchers
Toronto Blue Jays players
New York Mets players
Gulf Coast Blue Jays players
Vancouver Canadians players
Lansing Lugnuts players
Dunedin Blue Jays players
New Hampshire Fisher Cats players
Buffalo Bisons (minor league) players
Syracuse Mets players
Sandalwood High School alumni